Mussanjemaatu is a 2008 Indian Kannada-language romance film starring Sudeep and Ramya. The film was directed by Mussanje Mahesh. The  movie is produced by Suresh Jain. The music of the film was launched on 4 April 2008. The movie was released on 16 May 2008 in India. It was released in the United States and in Toronto on 30 November 2008. The movie was remade in Bengali as Achena Prem which released on 8 July 2011.

Plot 
The film revolves around the life of a Radio Jockey, Pradeep (Sudeep), who runs a radio programme called "Mussange Maathu" for depressed people. Tanu (Ramya) is a depressed girl who comes to Bangalore to live with her friend (Anu) and to find a new life. One day she calls Pradeep's radio programme and becomes very impressed by his suggestion.

Meanwhile, Pradeep and his team go to the streets of Bangalore to raise funds, to help a diseased person. There, he comes across Tanu and both become good friends, as days pass by.

Actually, Pradeep has been in love with Tanu since the very first moment he saw her on a train journey from Hubli to Bangalore. However, she doesn't realize his love for her and is about to marry someone else. Whether Pradeep is able express his love forms the rest of the story.

Cast

Soundtrack

V. Sridhar composed the film's background score and music for its soundtrack, who also wrote the lyrics for three tracks; Kaviraj, Revanna, V. Manohar, Bhaskar Gubbi and Ram Narayan wrote lyrics for one track each. The soundtrack album consists of eight tracks.

Awards and nominations

56th Filmfare Awards South :-
Best Male Playback Singer - Kannada - Winner - Sonu Nigam for the song "Enagali Munde Saagu Nee" 
Best Female Playback Singer - Kannada - Winner - Shreya Ghoshal for the song "Ninna Nodalento" 
Best Director - Kannada - Nominated - Mussanje Mahesh 
Best Actor - Kannada - Nominated - Sudeep
Best Actress - Kannada - Nominated - Ramya
Best Supporting Actress - Kannada - Nominated - Anu Prabhakar
Best Music Director - Kannada - Nominated - V. Sridhar
Best Male Playback Singer - Kannada - Nominated - Kunal Ganjawala for the song "Kaddalu Manasanna" 
Best Female Playback Singer - Kannada - Nominated - Shreya Ghoshal for the song "Aakasha Bhoomi" 
Best Lyricist - Kannada - Nominated - Ramnarayan for the song "Ninna Nodalento" 
Best Lyricist - Kannada - Nominated - V. Shridhar for the song "Enagali Munde Saagu Nee"

Remake 
Mussanje Maatu has been remade in Bengali with the name Achena Prem which was released on 8 July 2011. Surprisingly, the fact that it is a remake of the Kannada movie has not been mentioned either on the Achena Prem's official website or in other reviews/articles on the internet. All Kannada songs have been retained in the Bengali version. The Bengali version of the song "Enagali Munde Saagu Nee" is "Kar Mone te ki Swopno Thake" and "Ninna Nodalento" is "Tomake Bhebe Mon" and are available on YouTube.

References

External links
 
 
 Official site

2000s Kannada-language films
2008 films
Films scored by Sridhar V. Sambhram
Kannada films remade in other languages
2008 directorial debut films